The Euler D.I was a German single-seat fighter based on the French Nieuport 17. After seeing the success of the French Nieuport 11 at the front, German designer August Euler set about to create a German aircraft based on the Nieuport design. The Euler D.I first flew in late 1916. It was powered by an 80 hp engine with the Euler patented machine gun on the front.

Operational history
Two prototypes were recorded as being in service at the front in October 1916, and the German government ordered 50 in the same month. A further 50 were ordered in early 1917, but this order was largely transferred over to the D.I's successor, the Euler D.II. The plane saw very little combat service, being largely used as a fighter trainer for the remainder of the war.

Operators

Luftstreitkräfte;

Specifications

Bibliography
 William Green and  Gordon Swanborough. The Complete Book of Fighters.  Colour Library Direct, Godalming, UK: 1994. .

1910s German fighter aircraft
Sesquiplanes
Rotary-engined aircraft
Aircraft first flown in 1916